Crazylegs is a fictional character from the G.I. Joe: A Real American Hero toyline and comic book series. He is the G.I. Joe Team's assault trooper and debuted in 1987.

Profile
His real name is David O. Thomas, and his rank is that of corporal E-4. Crazylegs was born in Fort Dodge, Iowa.

Crazylegs's primary military specialty is infantry, and his secondary military specialty is parachute rigger. Crazylegs could have been an organist if his fingers hadn't been too short; instead he applied for the Airborne Rangers with a willingness to jump out of a helicopter into a hot landing zone with nothing but a rifle and a couple of grenades. Aside from being Airborne Ranger qualified, he has been cross-trained as a forward artillery observer.

Toys
Crazylegs was first released as an action figure in 1987. The figure was repainted and released as part of the "Night Force" line in 1988, packaged with Outback.

In spring of 2011, a new Crazylegs action figure, based on the appearance of the original 1987 release, was released as part of Hasbro's "Pursuit of Cobra" toyline.

Comics
In the Marvel Comics G.I. Joe series, he first appeared in issue #69. He is also featured in the following two issues. He assists Wild Bill and Maverick. At first, the three Joes had been coerced by the Dreadnoks Zarana, Monkeywrench and Thrasher, who had threatened to kill several civilians unless the Joes assisted in their escape. Soon, the Joes, the Dreadnoks and the civilians were all willingly working together; all escape danger.

Crazylegs is part of a massive Joe support unit sent to Cobra Island to support Serpentor in the first Cobra civil war. Aircraft attack the forces, severely injuring him and Lift-Ticket, but both survive.

Crazylegs is part of a mission in the fictional country of Trucial Abysmia. His squad of Joes destroy several Cobra facilities called Terror Dromes but they are captured to a man. A mistake while talking with Cobra Commander leads the Joe's captors, the Crimson Twins to assume the prisoners are to be executed. A S.A.W. Viper steps forward upon seeing the Twin's reluctance. He quickly slays Doc, Heavy Metal, Thunder and Crankcase. A concealed knife allows the survivors to wound the Viper and escape in a 'Cobra Rage' vehicle. The Joes manage to destroy several pursuers. The tank is hit by a Cobra 'Maggot', and Quick-Kick, Crazylegs and Breaker are killed. Cross Country, Duke and Lt. Falcon manage to escape to safety.

In the IDW comics series, Crazylegs is part of a three-man series set to investigate an assassin that has fired upon a Joe facility in Washington D.C. The entire team is killed.

References

External links
 Crazylegs at JMM's G.I. Joe Comics Home Page

Comics characters introduced in 1988
Fictional aviators
Fictional characters from Iowa
Fictional corporals
Fictional United States Army personnel
Fictional United States Army Rangers personnel
G.I. Joe soldiers
Male characters in comics